No. 12 Group of the Royal Air Force was a group, a military formation, that existed over two separate periods, namely the end of the First World War when it had a training function and from just prior to the Second World War until the early 1960s when it was tasked with an air defence role.

History

No. 12 Group was first formed on 1 April 1918 at RAF Cranwell, Lincolnshire, within No. 3 Area. It succeeded the Royal Navy's Central Depot and Training Establishment which had been training naval aviators at Cranwell since 1916. The first RAF General Officer Commanding was Brigadier-General H D Briggs who received the appointment on promotion from Captain in the Royal Navy. On 8 May 1918 the group transferred to Midland Area, and then to Northern Area on 18 October 1919. On 1 November that year the Group ceased to exist when it became the RAF (Cadet) College.

The group was reformed on 1 April 1937 in Fighter Command at RAF Uxbridge as No. 12 (Fighter) Group. It was the group responsible for aerial defence of the Midlands, Norfolk, Lincolnshire and North Wales. Construction of a purpose built site at RAF Watnall, a non-flying station, was not completed until late 1940, after which operations were relocated from nearby RAF Hucknall. During the Second World War this group was the second most important group of Fighter Command, and as such, it received its share of attacks from the German Luftwaffe throughout the war.

The commander of 12 Group during the Battle of Britain was Air Vice Marshal Trafford Leigh-Mallory, who was a rather ambitious man.  Despite his length of service in the RAF, he was passed over for being named the Air Officer Commanding of the more vital 11 Group in favour of Air Vice Marshal Keith Park.  Leigh-Mallory felt himself slighted over this and his relations with Park were poisoned thereafter.

As well as regional defence, 12 Group were also supposed to provide fighter cover for 11 Group airfields during the Battle of Britain, but several times, these fields were left undefended.  When Park complained about it, Leigh-Mallory responded that in order to test his Big Wing theory (espoused by Squadron Leader Douglas Bader), more time was needed to get the necessary squadrons airborne.

The Big Wings met with mixed success, enough for the Air Ministry to use it as an excuse to oust Park and Air Chief Marshal Hugh Dowding from their commands on the grounds that they had mismanaged the Battle of Britain.

After Park was ousted, Leigh-Mallory took over 11 Group.  12 Group still continued its assignment of defending the Midlands and supporting both 10 Group and 11 Group.

Group Headquarters moved to RAF Newton on 12 December 1946 and the operations block at Watnall was closed. 

Group HQ then moved again on 14 August 1959 to RAF Horsham St Faith.

It was disbanded on 1 Apri l963 and replaced by No. 12 (East Anglian) Sector, it moved to RAF Neatishead on 29 May 1963. On 30 April 1968, as the new Strike Command came into existence, 12 Group passed into history when No. 12 Sector began Sector South within No. 11 Group RAF.

Commanders
The following officers had command of No. 12 Group:

1918 to 1919
1 April 1918 Brigadier-General H D Briggs
1 May 1919 Brigadier-General F R Scarlett

1937 to 1963
1 April 1937 Air Vice-Marshal J H S Tyssen
4 December 1937 Air Vice-Marshal T L Leigh-Mallory
17 December 1940 Air Vice-Marshal R E Saul
29 November 1942 Air Vice-Marshal J O Andrews
1 June 1943 Air Vice-Marshal R M Hill
22 November 1943 Air Vice-Marshal M Henderson
1 January 1945 Air Vice-Marshal J W Baker
5 May 1946 Air Vice-Marshal T C Traill
17 November 1948 Air Vice-Marshal G Harcourt-Smith
1 June 1951 Air Vice-Marshal R L R Atcherley
13 November 1953 Air Vice-Marshal W J Crisham
25 June 1956 Air Vice-Marshal H P Fraser
1 August 1958 Air Commodore C H Hartley (Chief of Staff as acting AOC)
1 January 1959 Air Vice-Marshal J R A Embling
20 July 1959 Air Vice-Marshal C H Hartley
1 June 1961 Air Vice-Marshal R N Bateson

See also 
 List of Battle of Britain airfields
 List of Battle of Britain squadrons

References

Citations

Bibliography

012
Royal Air Force units and formations of the Battle of Britain
Military units and formations established in 1918
Military units and formations in Nottinghamshire
Organisations based in Nottinghamshire
012 Group RAF
1918 establishments in the United Kingdom